Cuba-Haiti relations refer to the bilateral relations between Cuba and Haiti. Cuba has an embassy in Port-au-Prince and Haiti has an embassy in Havana.

History
In 1959, Cuba and Haiti broke diplomatic relations during the dictatorship of François "Papa Doc" Duvalier. Duvalier broke off relations first after the United States urged member-states of the Organisation of American States to cut ties with Cuba after the Cuban Revolution. In 1977, despite having no official diplomatic ties, the Caribbean Nations signed Cuba–Haiti Maritime Boundary Agreement setting the official maritime border in the Windward Passage. Jean-Bertrand Aristide and Fidel Castro agreed to reestablish relations in 1997 and later that year, a Cuban Embassy opened up in Port-au-Prince.

Aid and development
Since Hurricane Georges, Cuba has sent medical aid to Haiti in the form of doctors, education and medical supplies. Over 3,000 doctors have been sent to Haiti since 1998 and have educated 550 Haitians at Latin American Medical School in Havana with 567 Haitians currently studying at ELAM as of 2010. From 1998 to 2010, Cuba performed over 207,000 Surgeries, restored eye sight to 45,000, 14.6 Million patient-doctor consultations, taught 100,000 how to read and helped in the birth of 100,000 children. In the aftermath of the 2010 Haiti Earthquake, Cuba was among the first responders sending medical teams seeing hundreds of thousands of patients, and performing over 70,000 surgeries. There has been documented change in infant mortality and life expectancy in Haiti due to Cuba's medical aid.

Haitians in Cuba
Haitian Cubans number 300,000 in Cuba, with Haitian Creole being the second most spoken language in the country. Many have arrived in recent years due to natural disasters in Haiti such as the 2010 Haiti Earthquake.

References

 
Haiti
Bilateral relations of Haiti